The May Bumps 2010 were a set of rowing races held in Cambridge, UK with crews from the boat clubs of all Cambridge University Colleges, the University Medical and Veterinary Schools and Anglia Ruskin University from Wednesday 9 June 2010 to Saturday 12 June 2010. The event was run as a bumps race and was the 119th set of races in the series of May Bumps which have been held annually in mid-June in this form since 1887. In 2010, a total of 172 crews took part (103 men's crews and 69 women's crews), with nearly 1550 participants in total.

Head of the River crews 

  men's 1st VIII rowed over to retain their headship gained in 2008.

  women's 1st VIII also rowed over to retain their headship held from 2008.

This was the second year running that there was no change in either the men's or women's headship.

Highest 2nd VIIIs 

  remained the highest men's 2nd VIII and their 15th position at the end of the week, bumping up on  but being caught by a resurgent .

Pegasus Cup and the Biggest Risers 

  won the Pegasus cup for the first time. The club's two boats moved up seven places up the rankings with the women winning and the men narrowly missing out on blades.

In the women's competition, both  and  climbed seven places, each winning blades.

Links to races in other years

Bumps Charts 

Below are the bumps charts all 6 men's and all 4 women's divisions, with the men's event on the left and women's event on the right. The bumps chart represents the progress of every crew over all four days of the racing. To follow the progress of any particular crew, simply find the crew's name on the left side of the chart and follow the line to the end-of-the-week finishing position on the right of the chart.

Note that this chart may not be displayed correctly if you are using a large font size on your browser. A simple way to check is to see that the first horizontal bold line, marking the boundary between divisions, lies between positions 17 and 18. The combined Hughes Hall/Lucy Cavendish women's crews are listed as Lucy Cavendish only.

The Getting-on Race 

The Getting-on Race (GoR) allows a number of crews which did not already have a place from last year's races to compete for the right to race this year. Up to ten crews are removed from the bottom of last year's finishing order, who must then race alongside new entrants to decide which crews gain a place (with one bumps place per 3 crews competing, subject to the maximum of 10 available places).

The 2010 May Bumps Getting-on Race took place on 4 June 2010.

Competing crews

Men 

16 men's crews raced for 10 available spaces at the bottom of the 6th division. The following were successful and rowed in the bumps.

 
 
 
 
 
 
 
 
 
 

The following were unsuccessful.

 
 
 
 
 

The following did not race.

Women 

9 women's crews raced for 4 available spaces at the bottom of the 4th division. The following were successful and rowed in the bumps.

 /*
 
 
 

The following were unsuccessful.

 
 
 
 

The following did not race.

References 
 CUCBC - the organisation that runs the bumps
 Cambridge University Radio (CUR1350) - live commentary, instant results, downloadable MP3s of race commentary

May Bumps results
May Bumps
May Bumps
May Bumps